Gavin Kwan Adsit (born 5 April 1996) is an Indonesian professional footballer who plays for Liga 1 club Persis Solo. Mainly a right-back, he can also play as a winger.

Personal life
Gavin was born in Kerobokan, Bali to an American father, John Adsit and Javanese-Chinese Indonesians descent mother, Maria Yosephine.

International career
In August 2011, Gavin was called up to the Indonesia U16 for 2012 AFC U-16 Championship qualification in Thailand. On 12 September 2011, He debuted in a youth national team when he coming as a starting in a 4–1 win against Myanmar U16 in the 2012 AFC U-16 Championship qualification. He also scored his first goal in 8th minute. Gavin made his international debut for senior team on 8 June 2017, against Cambodia. He scored his debut goal on 4 December 2017, against Mongolia.

Career statistics

Club

International

International under-23 goals

Honours

Club 
Bali United
 Liga 1: 2021–22

International 
Indonesia U-23
 Southeast Asian Games  Bronze medal: 2017
Indonesia
 Aceh World Solidarity Cup runner-up: 2017

Individual
 Liga 1 Best Eleven: 2017

References

External links
 
 

1996 births
Living people
Indo people
Javanese people
Indonesian people of American descent
Indonesian people of Chinese descent
Indonesian sportspeople of Chinese descent
Indonesian footballers
Sportspeople from Bali
People from Denpasar
Indonesia youth international footballers
Indonesia international footballers
Association football fullbacks
Association football wingers
Southeast Asian Games bronze medalists for Indonesia
Southeast Asian Games medalists in football
Footballers at the 2018 Asian Games
Competitors at the 2017 Southeast Asian Games
Asian Games competitors for Indonesia
Liga 1 (Indonesia) players
Mitra Kukar players
Borneo F.C. players
PS Barito Putera players
Bali United F.C. players
Persis Solo players